Al-Khaleej Al-Arabi Sport Club is an Iraqi football team based in Basra, that plays in Iraq Division Two.

Managerial history
  Chasib Al-Bazzouni

See also 
 2021–22 Iraq Division Two

References

External links
 Iraq Clubs- Foundation Dates
 Basra Clubs Union

Football clubs in Iraq
1992 establishments in Iraq
Association football clubs established in 1992
Football clubs in Basra
Basra